Santa Lucía La Reforma is a municipality in the Totonicapán department of Guatemala.

References

Municipalities of the Totonicapán Department